Kundli is a village in Post Gandal, Bamanwas Tehsil, in Sawai Madhopur district in the Indian state of Rajasthan.

Population

2011 Census Details
The total population is 598, in 132 households. Village literacy rate is 61.5% and the Female Literacy rate is 20.4%.

Politics     
The major political parties in this area are LSWP, BJP and INC.

Transport
  
Near By Tourist Places     

Kalakho   51 KM near     
Karauli   55 KM near     
Ranthambore   60 KM near     
Sawai Madhopur   63 KM near     
Jamwa Ramgarh   86 KM near

References

Cities and towns in Sawai Madhopur district